Reinier Kreijermaat (25 April 1935 – 22 January 2018) was a Dutch footballer who was active as a midfielder in the 1960s.

Career
Kreijermaat made his professional debut for USV Elinkwijk in 1956. He played for Elinkwijk until 1959, when he moved to Dutch heavyweights Feyenoord. He would spend the majority of his career playing for Feyenoord, winning three Eredivisie championships in the early 1960s and one Dutch Cup. He left the Rotterdam-club in 1967, finishing his career at Xerxes/DHC the following year.

He scored a total of 42 goals in his professional career and never received a yellow or red card.

Honours
Feyenoord
Eredivisie: 1960-61, 1961-62, 1964-65
KNVB Cup: 1964-65

References

 Profile

1935 births
2018 deaths
Association football midfielders
Dutch footballers
Eredivisie players
Feyenoord players
Footballers from Utrecht (city)
Netherlands international footballers
USV Elinkwijk players